Spring Green may refer to:

 Spring green (00FF80;    ), a color
 Spring bud (A7FC00;    ), a color formerly called "spring green"
 Spring greens, edible young leaves of certain plants
 Spring greens (Brassica oleracea), a Brassica oleracea cultivar similar to kale
 Spring Green Primitive Baptist Church, Hamilton, Martin County, North Carolina, USA; an NHRP-listed building
 Spring Green (Mechanicsville, Virginia), USA; an NRHP-listed home
 Spring Green, Wisconsin, USA; a village located in the town
 Spring Green (town), Wisconsin, USA

See also 

 Green Spring (disambiguation)

 Green (disambiguation)
 Spring (disambiguation)